Meymac is a commune in the department of Corrèze, in central France.

History
During the Hundred Years' War it was pillaged by Rodrigo de Villandrando.

Geography
The commune lies just south of the Millevaches Plateau and northwest of the Cantal mountains.

The Luzège has its source in the northern part of the commune; it flows south through the middle of the commune and crosses the town. The Triouzoune forms most of the commune's eastern boundary.

Meymac station has rail connections to Limoges, Brive-la-Gaillarde, Ussel and Bordeaux.

Population

Sights
 Arboretum du Puy Chabrol
 Douglaseraie des Farges
 Mont Bessou viewing tower

See also
Communes of the Corrèze department
Raymond Couvègnes

References

External links

  Meymac and the Mont Bessou, its observation tower, photos of the panorama and the surroundings

Communes of Corrèze
Limousin
Corrèze communes articles needing translation from French Wikipedia